Otto Friedmann Kernberg (born 10 September 1928) is an Austrian-born American psychoanalyst and professor of psychiatry at Weill Cornell Medicine. He is most widely known for his psychoanalytic theories on borderline personality organization and narcissistic pathology. In addition, his work has been central in integrating postwar ego psychology (which was primarily developed in the United States and the United Kingdom) with Kleinian and other object relations perspectives (which was developed primarily in the United Kingdom and South America). His integrative writings were central to the development of modern object relations, a theory of mind that is perhaps the theory most widely accepted among modern psychoanalysts.

Biography
Born in Vienna, Kernberg and his family fled Nazi Germany in 1939, emigrating to Chile. He studied biology and medicine and afterwards psychiatry and psychoanalysis with the Chilean Psychoanalytic Society. He first came to the U.S. in 1959 on a Rockefeller Foundation fellowship to study research in psychotherapy with Jerome Frank at the Johns Hopkins Hospital. In 1961 he emigrated to the U.S. joining the C.F. Menninger Memorial Hospital, later became director of the hospital until 1965. He was the Supervising and Training Analyst of the Topeka Institute for Psychoanalysis, and Director of the Psychotherapy Research Project of Menninger Foundation. During this time, the insight of his colleague Herman van der Waals contributed in raising Kernberg's awareness and interest in narcissistic personalities.

In 1973 he moved to New York where he was Director of the General Clinical Service of the New York State Psychiatric Institute. In 1974 he was appointed Professor of Clinical Psychiatry at the College of Physicians and Surgeons of Columbia University and Training and Supervising Analyst at the Columbia University Center for Psychoanalytic Training and Research. In 1976 he was appointed as Professor of Psychiatry at Cornell University and Director of the Institute for Personality Disorders Institute of the New York Hospital-Cornell Medical Center. He was President of the International Psychoanalytical Association from 1997 to 2001.  He was married to Paulina Kernberg, a child psychiatrist and also a Cornell professor, until her death in 2006.

His principal contributions have been in the fields of narcissism, object relations theory and personality disorders. He developed a novel and useful framework for coordinating personality disorders along dimensions of structural organization and severity.
He was awarded the 1972 Heinz Hartmann Award of the New York Psychoanalytic Society and Institute, the 1975 Edward A. Strecker Award from the Institute of Pennsylvania Hospital, the 1981 George E. Daniels Merit Award of the Association for Psychoanalytic Medicine.

Transference-focused psychotherapy  

Otto Kernberg designed an intensive form of psychoanalytic psychotherapy known as Transference-Focused Psychotherapy (TFP), which is intended to be suitable for Borderline Personality Organization (BPO) patients. BPO patients are described as experiencing so-called 'splits' in their affect and thinking, and the intended aim of the treatment is focused on the integration of split off parts of self and object representations.

TFP entails two to three 45 or 50-minute sessions per week. It views the individual as holding unreconciled and contradictory internalized representations of self and significant others that are affectively charged. The defense against these contradictory internalized object relations is called identity diffusion, and leads to disturbed relationships with others and with self. The distorted perceptions of self, others, and associated affects are the focus of treatment as they emerge in the relationship with the therapist (transference). The consistent interpretation of these distorted perceptions is considered the mechanism of change.

Suitable patients

Kernberg designed TFP especially for patients with BPO. In his model, these patients suffer from identity diffusion, primitive defense operations and unstable reality testing.

Identity diffusion results from pathological object relations and involves contradictory character traits, discontinuity of self and either very idealized or devalued object relations. Defense operations often applied by BPO patients are splitting, denial, projective identification, primitive devaluation / idealization and omnipotence. Reality testing is negatively influenced by the primitive defense mechanisms as they change a person's perception of self and others.

Goals of TFP
The major goals of TFP are better behavioral control, increased affect regulation, more intimate and gratifying relationships and the ability to pursue life goals. This is believed to be accomplished through the development of integrated representations of self and others, the modification of primitive defensive operations and the resolution of identity diffusion that perpetuate the fragmentation of the patient's internal representational world. To do this, the client's affectively charged internal representations of previous relationships are consistently interpreted as the therapist becomes aware of them in the therapeutic relationship, that is, the transference. Techniques of clarification, confrontation, and interpretation are used within the evolving transference relationship between the patient and the therapist.

Treatment procedure

Contract

The treatment begins with the development of the treatment contract, which consists of general guidelines that apply for all clients and of specific items developed from problem areas of the individual client that could interfere with the therapy progress. The contract also contains therapist responsibilities. The client and the therapist must agree to the content of the treatment contract before the therapy can proceed.

Therapeutic process

TFP consists of the following three-steps: 
(a) the diagnostic description of a particular internalized object relation in the transference
(b) the diagnostic elaboration of the corresponding self and object representation in the transference, and of their enactment in the transference /countertransference and
(c) the integration of the split-off self representations, leading to an integrated sense of self and others which resolves identity diffusion.

During the first year of treatment, TFP focuses on a hierarchy of issues: 
the containment of suicidal and self-destructive behaviors
the various ways of destroying the treatments
the identification and recapitulation of dominant object relational patterns (from unintegrated and undifferentiated affects and representations of self and others to a more coherent whole).

Mechanisms of change

In TFP, hypothesized mechanisms of change derive from Kernberg's developmentally based theory of Borderline Personality Organisation, conceptualized in terms of unintegrated and undifferentiated affects and representations of self and other. Partial representations of self and other are paired and linked by an affect in mental units called object relation dyads. These dyads are elements of psychological structure. In borderline pathology, the lack of integration of the internal object relations dyads corresponds to a 'split' psychological structure in which totally negative representations are split off/segregated from idealized positive representations of self and other (seeing people as all good or all bad). The putative global mechanism of change in patients treated with TFP is the integration of these polarized affect states and representations of self and other into a more coherent whole.

Theory on narcissism and the controversy with H. Kohut  

Otto Kernberg states that there are three types of narcissism: normal adult narcissism, normal infantile narcissism, and pathological narcissism. Pathological narcissism, defined as the libidinal investment in a pathological structure of the self, is further divided into three types (regression to the regulation of the infantile self-esteem, narcissistic choice of object, narcissistic personality disorder) with narcissistic personality disorder being the most severe of all. Still, narcissism has been a great source of disagreement between Otto Kernberg and Heinz Kohut. Although both focused on narcissistic, borderline, and psychotic patients, the focus and content of their theory and treatment has been considerably differentiated. Their major diversities emerged in response to their conceptualizations regarding the relationship between Narcissistic and Borderline personalities, normal vs. pathological narcissism, their ideas about narcissistic idealization and the grandiose self, as well as the psychoanalytic technique and the narcissistic transference.

Theory on narcissism  

According to Kernberg, the self is an intrapsychic structure consisting of multiple self representations. It is a realistic self which integrates both good and bad self-images. That is, the self constitutes a structure that combines libidinally and aggressively invested components. Kernberg defines normal narcissism as the libidinal investment of the self. However, it needs to be emphasized that this libidinal investment of the self is not merely derived from an instinctual source of libidinal energy. On the contrary, it stems from the several relationships between the self and other intrapsychic structures, such as the ego the superego and the id.

Types of narcissism

Normal adult narcissism
This is a normal self-esteem based on normal structures of the self. The individual has introjected whole representations of objects, has stable objects relationships and a solid moral system. The superego is fully developed and individualized.

Normal infantile narcissism
Regulation of self-esteem occurs through gratifications related to the age, which include or imply a normal infantile system of values, demands or prohibitions.

Pathological narcissism
Three subtypes

   Regression to the regulation of infantile self-esteem. The ideal ego is dominated by infantile pursuits, values and prohibitions. The regulation of self-esteem is overly dependent on expressions or defences against infantile pleasures, which are discarded in adult life. This is the mildest type of narcissistic pathology.
   Narcissistic choice of object. This type is more severe than the first one but more rare. The representation of the infantile self is projected on an object and then identified through that same object. Thus, a libidinal association is generated, where the functions of the self and the object have been exchanged.
   Narcissistic personality disorder. This type is different from both normal adult narcissism and from regression to normal infantile narcissism. It is the most severe type and is suitable for psychoanalysis.

In Kernberg's view, narcissistic personalities are differentiated from both normal adult narcissism and from fixation at or regression to normal infantile narcissism. Fixation at a primitive stage of development or lack of development of specific intrapsychic structures is not adequate to explain the characteristics of narcissistic personalities. Those characteristics (through a process of pathological differentiation and integration of ego and superego structures) are the consequence of pathological object relationships. Pathological narcissism is not merely the libidinal investment in the self but in a pathological, underdeveloped structure of the self. This pathological structure presents defences against early self and object images, which are either libidinally or aggressively invested. The psychoanalytic process brings to the surface primitive object relations, conflicts and defences, which are typical of the developmental stages that precede the stability of the object.

Kernberg vs. Kohut 

Otto Kernberg and Heinz Kohut can be considered to be two theorists that have markedly influenced past and current psychoanalytic thinking. Both focused on the observation and treatment of patients who were otherwise thought to be unsuitable for analytic therapy. Their main work has been mostly related to individuals with narcissistic, borderline, and psychotic psychopathology. Still, their perspectives concerning the causes, psychic organization, and treatment of these disorders have been considerably different. Taken as a whole, Kohut is regarded as a self theorist who radically departed from Sigmund Freud's conjectural conceptualizations, focusing mostly on people's need for self-organization and self-expression. Kernberg in contrast, remained faithful to the Freudian metapsychology, concentrating more on people's struggle between love and aggression. Their main differences are summarized below.

Relationship between narcissistic personality and borderline personality

One of the main disagreements between the two theorists revolves around their conceptualization among narcissistic and borderline disorders. According to Kernberg, the defensive structure of the narcissistic individual is quite similar to that of the borderline person since the former has a fairly underlying borderline personality organization which becomes obvious when one looks at the defenses of splitting and projective identification. He identifies constitutional along with environmental factors as the source of disturbance for these individuals by stressing the important role of the mother surrogate who treats the child on the surface (callously) with little regard for his/her feelings and needs. Kohut on the other hand, sees borderline personality as totally distinct from the narcissistic one and less able to benefit from the analytic treatment. Equally, a narcissistic personality is more apt for analysis since it is characterized by a more resilient self. According to Kohut , the environment alone is the major cause of troubles for these persons. Moreover, although both focus on the concept of the "grandiose self" in their narcissistic personality theorizing, they provide different explanations for it. For Kohut, "grandiose self" reflects the "fixation of an archaic 'normal' primitive self" while for Kernberg it is a pathological development, different from normal narcissism. For Kohut treatment should be primarily centered on encouraging the patient's narcissistic desires, wishes, and needs to open up during the process of transference. For Kernberg, the goal of treatment should be to use confrontation strategies so as to help the patient integrate his/her internal fragmented world.

Normal vs. pathological narcissism

One of the main arguments between Kohut and Kernberg is about normal and pathological narcissism. As mentioned earlier, Kohut assumes that a narcissistic personality suffers from developmental arrest. Specifically, he assumes that this type of personality mirrors adaptive narcissistic wishes, needs, and objectives that, nevertheless, have not been satisfied during childhood development by the parental environment. Here, the grandiose self is nothing more than an archaic form that prospectively ought to become the normal self. When this does not occur then pathological narcissism emerges. In his explanation of pathological narcissism, he pays attention on the libidinal forces or charges in order to provide an etiology of how this disorder develops. For him the aggression drive is of secondary importance in respect to the libidinal drive and that is why one should differentiate between ordinary aggression and narcissistic rage. The first, according to him, is adaptive for eradicating obstructions when heading toward a realistic goal whereas the second is the forceful response to narcissistic injury. Kernberg however, sees Kohut's ideas as de-emphasizing the power of aggression. He allies more to the Freudian conceptualization, by proposing that narcissistic behavior results from pathological development in which aggressive drives play a central role. He argues that narcissism on the whole involves a strong aggressive drive that cannot possibly be analyzed separately from the libidinal one. As he says, "one cannot study the vicissitudes of normal and pathological narcissism without relating the development of the respective internalized object relations to both libidinal and aggressive drive alternatives."

Relationship between narcissistic idealization and grandiose self

Kohut departed from the classical Freudian view, which suggested that some patients could not be analyzed given that they lacked the ability to develop transferences. He postulated that narcissistic patients are capable of presenting transferences but these are somewhat different from those of other patients, such as the neurotics. He distinguished three types, namely the idealizing, the mirror, or the twinship transference. His debate with Kernberg concerns mostly the idealizing transference, which, according to Kohut, relates to a fixation at an archaic level of normal development. Still Kernberg believed that the idealizing transference is nothing more than a pathological type of idealization that is produced as a response to the substantial instigation of the grandiose self in the transference.

Psychoanalytic technique and narcissistic transference 

Otto F. Kernberg and Heinz Kohut regard the analytic process as well as the role of the analyst in quite different terms.

The analytical situation concerning pathological narcissism according to Otto F. Kernberg 

Kernberg requests a methodological and persistent interpretation of the defensive function of grandiosity and idealization as they emerge in transference. The role of the analyst should be neutral rather than supportive, especially during the confrontation process, in order to modify the narcissist's pathological structure. "The analyst must be continuously focusing on the particular quality of the transference in these cases and consistently counteract the patient's efforts toward omnipotent control and devaluation". This traditional emphasis on aggressive interpretation of narcissistic phenomena derives from and is wholly consistent with Freud's early view of narcissistic neuroses as unanalysable and narcissistic defenses as generating the most recalcitrant resistances to the analytic process.

The analytical situation concerning pathological narcissism according to Heinz Kohut
In contrast to seeing primitive grandiosity or idealization as a representation of a defensive retreat from reality, Heinz Kohut regards narcissistic illusions within the analytic situation as representations of the patient's attempt to establish crucial developmental opportunities. These narcissistic illusions thus give an opportunity for revitalization of the self. Therefore, Heinz Kohut advocates that the analyst's position within treatment should be one where a full narcissistic transference should be encouraged instead of being challenged. To establish this, the analyst should be able to show empathic comprehension, which entails a receptivity to the narcissistic illusions and an avoidance at all costs of anything which would challenge them or suggest they are unrealistic. Heinz Kohut used the concepts of narcissistic transference and self-object needs. He also stressed the significance of infantilism and what appear to be excessive demands on the analyst and everyone else. Rather than instinctual wishes to be renounced, they are missed developmental needs to be warmly received and understood. The patient is groping toward self-cure, by trying to extract from others what was missing early in his development. Heinz Kohut feels the patient knows what he needs, regardless of what the analyst may think he knows. He stresses the importance of hopes in maturity and throughout development. There is an enduring need for ideals and idealization that vitalizes self experience. In his work with narcissistic patients, the defining feature of Heinz Kohut's psychoanalytic methodology became therefore empathic immersion (or vicarious inspection), whereby he tried to put himself in his patient's shoes. This view is certainly in contrast with Freud's early view of the analyzability of narcissistic defenses as discussed above.

Approaches as regarded by Heinz Kohut and Otto F. Kernberg 
Both Kohut and Kernberg regarded each other's approaches as counterproductive.  
From Kohut's point of view, the methodical interpretive approach recommended by Kernberg is interpreted by the narcissistically vulnerable patient as an assault and generates intense narcissistic rage. As Kernberg instead recommends this methodology for treating these patients, self-psychology regards Kernberg as creating narcissism instead of treating it.
On the other hand, Kernberg (from the more traditional point of view) sees the approach of Kohut as leading to nothing. An unquestioning acceptance of the patient's illusions with the assumption that they will eventually diminish of their own accord represents a collusion with the patient's defenses. The analytic process is thereby subverted and the analyst never emerges as a figure who can meaningfully help the patient.

An integrative relational approach 
However, Stephen A. Mitchell offers an integrative relational approach in which the perspectives of both Kernberg and Kohut are connected. In his opinion, "the more traditional approach to narcissism highlights the important ways in which the narcissistic illusions are used defensively, but misses their role in health and creativity and in consolidating certain kinds of developmentally crucial relationships with others. The developmental-arrest approach (Kohut) had generated a perspective on narcissism which stresses the growth-enhancing function of narcissistic illusions, but overlooks the extent to which they often constrict and interfere in real engagements between the analysand and other people, including the analyst". Mitchell recommends a "subtle dialectic between articulating and embracing the analysand's illusions on the one hand, and the provision of larger context in which they can be experienced, on the other".

Kernberg's developmental model 

One of Kernberg's major contributions is his developmental model. This model is built on the developmental tasks one has to complete in order to develop healthy relationships. When one fails to accomplish a certain developmental task, this responds to the increased risk to develop certain psychopathologies. Whereby failing the first developmental task, which is psychic clarification of self and other, an increased risk of development of varieties of psychosis results. Not accomplishing the second task (overcoming splitting) results in an increased risk of developing a borderline personality disorder.

Furthermore, his developmental model includes Kernberg's view about drives, in which he differs from Freud. Kernberg was obviously inspired by Melanie Klein, whose model draws mainly on the paranoid-schizoid position and on the depressive position. More elaborate information on Kernberg's ideas can be found in a recent publication by Cohen M. (2000).

First months
Kernberg saw the infant in the first months of his life as struggling to sort out his experience on the basis of the affective valence of this experience. The infant moves back and forth between two different affective states. One state is characterized as pleasurable and gratified; the other state is unpleasurable, painful and frustrating. Regardless of what one is in, no distinction is made between self and other.

Developmental tasks

First developmental task: psychic clarification of self and other
The first developmental task embodies being able to make a distinction between what is self and what is other. When this task would not be accomplished, one cannot develop a dependable sense of the self as separate and distinct because one cannot make a distinction between one's own experience and the experience of others. This failure is hypothesized to be the major precursor for all psychotic states. In schizophrenic symptoms (hallucinations, delusions, psychic fragmentation) we can see a lack of being able to separate between internal and external world, own experience and experience of others, own mind and the mind of another.

Second developmental task: overcome splitting
The second developmental task is to overcome splitting. When the first developmental task is accomplished, one is able to differentiate between self-images and object images; however, these images remain segregated affectively. Loving self images and images of good objects are held together by positive affects, or libidinal affects. Hateful images of the self and bad, frustrating object images are held together by negative or aggressive affects. The good is separated from the bad. The developmental task is accomplished when the child is able to see objects as "whole", meaning that the child can see objects as being both good and bad. Next to seeing "whole" objects, the child is required to see the self as being loving and hating, as being good and bad at the same time. When one fails to accomplish this second developmental task, this will result in a borderline pathology, meaning that objects or the self cannot be seen as both good and bad; something is good, or it is bad, but both affects cannot be in the same object together.

Developmental stages 
Kernberg's model of self and object development rests on five stages that delineate the growth of the internalized object relations units, some of which already start taking place during the precipitating stage. The stages are not static, but fluent.

Stage 1 (0 to 1 month): Normal autism
This stage is marked by undifferentiated self-object representations. This stage is equated with Mahler, Pine and Bergman's conception of autism.

Stage 2 (2 months to 6–8 months): Normal symbiosis
In the beginning of this stage the child is unable to integrate opposing affective valences. Libidinally invested and aggressively invested representations are strictly separated into a 'good' self-object representation and a 'bad' self-object representation.

Stage 3 (6–8 months to 18–36 months): Differentiation of self from object relations
In this stage the 'good' self-object representation differentiates into a 'good' self and a 'good' object and shortly thereafter the 'bad' self-object representation differentiates into a 'bad' self and a 'bad' object. A failure of the child to differentiate between self and other results in a psychotic personality organization; one has failed to accomplish the first developmental task and is stuck in stage II. Although in this stage differentiation between self and object has taken place the good and bad self and object representations are strictly separated through the mechanism of splitting in order to protect the ideal, good relationship with the mother from contamination by bad self representations and bad representations of her.

Stage 4 (36+ months through the oedipal period): The integration of self representations and object representations
During this stage the 'good' (libidinally invested) and 'bad' (aggressively invested) self and object representations are integrated into a definite self-system and a total object representation. One is able to comprehend the possibility of the self or other containing both positive and negative characteristics. A failure of this results in a borderline personality organization; one has failed to accomplish the second developmental task and is stuck in stage III. Consequently, the good self and object must still be protected from the aggression by the splitting of good and bad.

Stage 5: Consolidation of superego and ego integration
In this stage ego, superego and id are consolidated in definite intrapsychic structures.

By successfully completing all the developmental tasks, the child has developed a neurotic personality organization, which is the strongest personality structure.

Kernberg's view on drives
In contrast with Freud's perspective, drives are not inborn according to Kernberg. The libidinal and aggressive drives are shaped, developed over time by experiences of interactions with others. The child's good and bad affects become consolidated and shaped into libidinal and aggressive drives. Good, pleasurable interactions with others consolidate, over time, into a pleasure-seeking (libidinal) drive. In the same way bad, unsatisfying and frustrating interactions with others, become consolidated into a destructive (aggressive) drive over time.

Publications 
 Borderline conditions and pathological narcissism, New York, Jason Aronson, 1975
 Object relations theory and clinical psychoanalysis, New York, Jason Aronson, 1976
 Severe personality disorders: Psychotherapeutic strategies, New Haven, Yale University Press, 1984
 Aggression in Personality Disorders and Perversions, Yale University Press, 1992
 The suicidal risk in severe personality disorders: Differential diagnosis and treatment. Journal of Personality Disorders. The Guilford Press, 2001

Notes

References
Christopher, J.C., Bickhard, M.H., & Lambeth, G.S. (2001). "Otto Kernberg's object relations theory: A metapsychological critique." Theory & Psychology, 11,687-711.
Clarkin, J.F., Yeomans, F.E., & Kernberg O.F. (1999). Psychotherapy for Borderline Personality. New York: J. Wiley and Sons.
Cohen, M. (2000). Love Relations: Normality and Pathology: Otto Kernberg, Yale University Press. Journal of American Academic Psychoanalysis, 28, 181-184.
Consolini, G. (1999). Kernberg Versus Kohut: A (Case) Study in Contrasts. Clinical Social Work Journal, 27, 71-86.
Foelsch, P. A. &  Kernberg, O. F. (1998). Transference-Focused Psychotherapy for Borderline Personality Disorders. In Session: Psychotherapy in Practise. 4/2:67-90.
Kernberg, O.F. (1975). Borderline Conditions and Pathological Narcissism.. New York: Aronson.
Kernberg, O.F. (1976). Object Relations Theory and Clinical Psychoanalysis. New York: Jason Aronson.
Kernberg, O.F. (1984). Severe personality disorders: Psychotherapeutic strategies. New Haven, CT: Yale University Press.
Kernberg, O.F., Selzer, M.A., Koenigsberg H.A., Carr, A.C. & Appelbaum, A.H. (1989). Psychodynamic Psychotherapy of Borderline Patients. New York: Basic Books.
Kernberg, O.F. (2001). The suicidal risk in severe personality disorders: Differential diagnosis and treatment. Journal of Personality Disorders. The Guilford Press
Koenigsberg, H.W., Kernberg, O.F., Stone, M.H., Appelbaum, A.H., Yeomans, F.E., & Diamond, D.D. (2000). Borderline Patients: Extending the Limits of Treatability. New York: Basic Books.
Mitchell, S.A. & Black, M., (1995). Freud and beyond: A history of modern psychoanalytic thought. Basic Books: New York.
Solan, R. (1998). Narcissistic Fragility in the Process of Befriending the Unfamiliar. Psychoanal. Amer. J. Psycho-Anal., Vol. 58:(2)163-186. [https://web.archive.org/web/20030417141513/http://www.springerlink.com/]
Solan, R. (1999). The Interaction Between Self and Other: A Different Perspective on Narcissism. Psychoanal. Study of the Child, 54: 193-215.
Yeomans, F.E., Clarkin, J.F., & Kernberg, O.F. (2002). A Primer of Transference-Focused Psychotherapy for the Borderline Patient. Northvale, NJ: Jason Aronson.
Yeomans, F.E., Selzer, M.A., & Clarkin, J.F. (1992). Treating the Borderline Patient: A Contract-based Approach. New York: Basic Books.   Kernberg, O. (2001) The suicidal risk in severe personality disorders: differential diagnosis and treatment

External links

Interview with Otto Kernberg (Psychotherapy.net)
Kernberg, O. F., and Michels, R. (2009). Borderline Personality Disorder. American Journal of Psychiatry, 166, 505–508.
Kernberg’s Borderline Conditions and Pathological Narcissism. Psychiatric Times, 26(2).

1928 births
Austrian emigrants to the United States
Austrian Jews
American people of Austrian-Jewish descent
Columbia University faculty
Johns Hopkins University alumni
American psychoanalysts
Jewish psychoanalysts
Cornell University faculty
Living people
Jewish psychiatrists
Narcissism writers
Object relations theorists
Borderline personality disorder experts